The first season of Australian Survivor is the inaugural Australian adaptation of the popular reality game show Survivor. The season was filmed in Whaler's Way, an Eyre Peninsula coastal nature reserve near Port Lincoln, South Australia in the Great Australian Bight, where numerous ships had sunk off the coast in the past, setting up the season's nautical theme. 

Hosted by 60 Minutes journalist Lincoln Howes, the program consisted of 16 Australian castaways competing for 39 days for a grand prize of A$500,000 and a Ford V6 Escape. The series was filmed in November and December 2001 and aired weekly between February and May 2002 on the Nine Network, culminating in a live finale on 15 May 2002, where former Victorian Football League player Robert "Rob" Dickson was crowned the "Sole Survivor" over former test pilot Sciona Browne in a jury vote of 5–2.  

The program was criticised by fans and critics for poor casting and lower production values than the popular American edition (which also aired on Nine) and was not renewed due to low ratings. However the series did return (albeit on a different network) in 2006 with a celebrity edition.

Production

Conception
In 2000, Nine began airing Survivor: Borneo, the first season of the American Survivor production. The agreement for Nine to air the American series included the condition that they must produce their own local Australian edition of Survivor. The local edition was announced publicly during the night of the local airing of the finale of Survivor: The Australian Outback in early May 2001. This announcement also began the casting call for Australians willing to compete on the show.

Filming and development 
The people included for consideration for host included Grant Kenny, Jamie Durie and Richard Hatch, the "Sole Survivor" of Survivor: Borneo. Eventually, Lincoln Howes, a journalist from Nine's 60 Minutes, was named as host.

The production scouted locations across Australia to be used for the series. Locations considered included Uluru/Ayers Rock in the Northern Territory and the Kimberley region in Western Australia. However production settled on Whaler's Way, on the South Australian coastline,  from the town of Port Lincoln, where the production crew was based. This location set up a nautical/shipwreck theme for the series. A majority of the challenges centred around the water (many of which were originally created by the show and not derived from the American series), Tribal Council was located on a shipwreck called "The Great Beyond", tribal immunity was in the form of a bell, and individual immunity was in the form of a rope necklace with shark's teeth. The theme song incorporated an Irish jig in a nod to Australian history – First Fleet arriving. An extended version of the main theme was played during the closing credits of the live finale and reunion show.

Broadcast
The show was broadcast by the Nine Network in the Wednesday 8:30 pm time slot and was rated PG. In addition to 12 regular hour-long episodes and the 3-hour long finale/reunion show, two specials for the series were produced. An auditions special hosted by Ben Dark aired the day before the main series aired, showing some of the highlights and lowlights from the 8,500 audition submissions sent into the show before revealing the 16 people who would compete on the series. Additionally, the program included an interview with Ethan Zohn; the "Sole Survivor" of Survivor: Africa. The other special was a behind-the-scenes show that aired a few weeks after the series ended and was titled Surviving Survivor. Among other things, this special revealed that the final four wanted to quit the show due to the dramatic turn of events concerning Katie's behaviour (her mental breakdown right before the Tribal Council on Day 37). The producers threatened to give the prize money to the last eliminated contestant (Sophie) if the contestants continued to defy production.

The format of the Finale and Reunion shows of Nine's Australian Survivor was rather different to the American edition's finales at the time. The finale/reunion program featured reunion show host, Eddie McGuire introducing each segment of the show live from the finale venue as the night progressed. The American production adopted this format starting with its 28th season, Survivor: Cagayan, in 2014, until the practice of a studio reunion show was dropped, with the last studio reunion being a part of the 39th season,  Survivor: Island of the Idols.

Promotion
The evicted contestant from each episode was featured for an interview on the Today show on the following day. These interviews were conducted by Richard Wilkins just before the 8:00 AM news. This paralleled the American edition, where evicted Survivor contestants were interviewed on CBS' The Early Show during its time on air. 

The program had several sponsors who were involved in product placements spots on the show (most as rewards for reward challenges). Sponsors included Cadbury, IBM, Jetset travel agencies, Schweppes, Fa deodorant for men, Lays potato crisps, Telstra, Ford and Intel Pentium (which was also used in producing the show's graphics).

Contestants
The sixteen players were initially separated into two tribes, Kadina and Tipara, both named after ships that traveled in the area. On Day 19, the ten remaining players merged into the Aurora tribe. The final nine players made up the two finalists and the seven members of the Tribal Council jury, who ultimately decided who would be the "Sole Survivor".

Season summary
The sixteen players were divided into two tribes: Kadina in green, and Tipara in blue. Tipara won more immunity challenges, and their members stuck together to systematically eliminate the Kadina members after the merge. A final three alliance of Rob, Sciona, and Joel emerged, and Rob eliminated Joel after winning the final immunity challenge. The jury respected Rob's leadership over Sciona's quieter gameplay, naming the former as Sole Survivor.

In the case of multiple tribes or castaways who win reward or immunity, they are listed in order of finish, or alphabetically where it was a team effort; where one castaway won and invited others, the invitees are in brackets.
Notes

Episodes

Voting history

Notes

Controversy and criticisms

The program received a large amount of criticism from fans of the American series, mainly centred on how this series was of lesser quality when compared to the US series.

The casting process was criticised as the cast lacked diversity, being almost completely composed of 16 white middle class Australian people with very few of the 16 being there to "play the game". This lack of drive was especially evident in contestant Lucinda Allen-Rhodes, who not only asked to be voted off, but also was one of the very few people to cast a vote against herself at Tribal Council. In most other editions of Survivor, contestants cannot vote against themselves. 

The nature of the camp life of the castaways was also criticised. The tribes were limited on which days they could go search for food. Tipara could go to the coast and fish while Kadina could only go to the windmill and pump water and on the next day, the tribes swapped.  Additionally, the producers were also criticised for giving the contestants too many supplies.  

The show also resulted in criticism in how the network aired the American series. Nine advertised that Survivor: Marquesas would air after the Australian series. Australian fans were upset when Nine decided not to broadcast Marquesas. It was skipped and instead, the network aired Survivor: Thailand. In late 2018, Marquesas was made legally available to Australian viewers via the 10 All Access streaming platform, which includes all prior seasons of the American edition.

In New Zealand, both Australian Survivor and Survivor: Marquesas aired concurrently.

Ratings
Although the show started off with satisfying ratings, it eventually declined to dismal ratings (possibly due to the popularity of another reality TV show, The Mole, which aired on Channel Seven an hour earlier at 7:30pm for all but four weeks of the Australian Survivor run). This showed especially when Nine decided to air the special, Surviving Survivor, in a late-night timeslot a fortnight after the conclusion of the series.

References

External links
 

Australian Survivor seasons
2002 Australian television seasons
Television shows filmed in Australia